The Mount Holly School District was a school district headquartered in Mount Holly, Arkansas.

On July 1, 2004, the district was consolidated into the Smackover School District.

References

External links
 

Defunct school districts in Arkansas
2004 disestablishments in Arkansas
School districts disestablished in 2004
Education in Union County, Arkansas